The Lethrinops red flush (Lethrinops parvidens) is a species of cichlid fish endemic to Lake Malawi where it is found over sandy substrates in the southern portion of the lake.  This species grows to a length of  SL.

References

Lethrinops red flush
Taxa named by Ethelwynn Trewavas
Fish described in 1931
Taxonomy articles created by Polbot